Romina Ccuno (born 1 September 2002) is a Peruvian tennis player.

Ccuno has career-high rankings by the WTA of 629 in singles and 436 in doubles. Up to date, she has won four doubles titles on the ITF Circuit.

Playing for Peru Fed Cup team, Ccuno has a win–loss record of 0–4 in Fed Cup competitions.

ITF Circuit finals

Singles: 1 (runner–up)

Doubles: 10 (4 titles, 6 runner–ups)

References

External links
 
 
 

2002 births
Living people
Peruvian female tennis players
21st-century Peruvian women